Oslo Bus Terminal is the main bus station serving Oslo, Norway. It is connected to Grønland station. Also known as Oslo Bussterminal. Owned by Vaterland AS, it is located beside Oslo Central Station and serves local buses to Akershus as well as domestic and international coaches.

Service
The station was built by the Akershus transit authority Stor-Oslo Lokaltrafikk as a bus station for their routes to Downtown Oslo. The station is five minutes walk from Oslo Central Station, as well as the rapid transit station Jernbanetorget and the tram and city bus services at ground on Jernbanetorget. On the east side of the station, a tram station named Bussterminalen Grønland allowed the quickest transfers to the Ekeberg Line. It was closed in late 2020.

References

Bus stations in Oslo